Unedogemmula bemmeleni is an extinct species of sea snail, a marine gastropod mollusk in the family Turridae, the turrids.

Description

Distribution
This extinct marine species was found in Miocene strata in Borneo.

References

 Oostingh, C H. 1941. Over de tertiaire molluskenfauna van Palembang. — Ingenieur Nederl. Indië, 1941,3, IV: 21-29, pis 1-2. 

bemmeleni
Gastropods described in 1941